Vassilios Iliadis (born 18 September 1981) is a Greek judoka and sambist.

Achievements

References

1981 births
Living people
Greek male judoka
Judoka at the 2004 Summer Olympics
Olympic judoka of Greece
Place of birth missing (living people)
21st-century Greek people